Joseph Ossai (born April 13, 2000) is a Nigerian professional gridiron football defensive end for the Cincinnati Bengals of the National Football League (NFL). Born in Nigeria, Ossai moved to the United States in 2010, where he played college football at the University of Texas. He was drafted by the Bengals in the third round of the 2021 NFL Draft.

Early life and high school
Ossai was born in Lagos, Nigeria, lived there until his family moved to Conroe, Texas when he was 10. He attended Oak Ridge High School, where he played basketball and football. As a senior, he recorded 58 tackles, eight sacks, 15 tackles for loss and three forced fumbles and was named  first-team All-District 12-6A and first-team All-Greater Houston by the Houston Chronicle. Ossai was rated a four-star recruit and committed to play college football at Texas over offers from Texas A&M, Notre Dame and Oregon.

College career
As a true freshman, Ossai played in all 14 of the Longhorns' games with two starts and made 20 total tackles with one a sack and a forced fumble. He led the team with 62 tackles in his sophomore season while also recording five sacks, two interceptions, one pass broken up, one forced fumble and also blocked a kick. Ossai was named to the Bronko Nagurski Trophy, Chuck Bednarik Award and Lott IMPACT Trophy watchlists entering his junior season.  As a Junior, he had 55 tackles, 15.5 tackles for loss, and 5 sacks.  On December 14, 2020, Ossai announced his decision to enter the 2021 NFL draft, choosing to forgo Texas' 2020 Bowl game and his senior season.

Professional career

Ossai was selected by the Cincinnati Bengals in the third round (69th overall) of the 2021 NFL Draft. He signed his four-year rookie contract on June 2, 2021. Ossai suffered a meniscus injury in the second preseason game. He was placed on injured reserve on August 31, 2021, ending his season. 

Ossai made his NFL debut in the Bengals' 2022 regular season opener against the Pittsburgh Steelers. In Week 18 against the Baltimore Ravens, he recorded a fumble recovery for a touchdown in the 27–16 victory. He appeared in 16 regular season games and recorded 3.5 sacks, 17 total tackles, one pass defended, and two fumble recoveries. In the AFC Championship against the Kansas City Chiefs, Ossai committed an unnecessary roughness penalty with eight seconds left in regulation on quarterback Patrick Mahomes resulting in a 15 yard penalty and much closer field goal attempt (45 Yards) which kicker Harrison Butker converted to advance to the Super Bowl.

References

External links
 Cincinnati Bengals bio
 Texas Longhorns bio

2000 births
Living people
All-American college football players
American football defensive ends
American football outside linebackers
Cincinnati Bengals players
Nigerian players of American football
People from Conroe, Texas
Players of American football from Texas
Sportspeople from Lagos
Sportspeople from the Houston metropolitan area
Texas Longhorns football players